Tengenjutsu  is a Japanese fortune telling method. It is based on yin and yang and the five elements, and uses a persons birth date in the sexagenary cycle and physical appearance to predict ones fate. Tengen-jutsu originated in various Chinese practices, but was first systemized by the early Edo period monk Tenkai. It is also the origin of Tōkyūjutsu.

See also 
 Futomani
 Itako
 Kokkuri
 Omikuji
 Onmyōdō

References 

Religion in Japan
Divination